Herbert John Pearce (3 April 1908 – 4 November 1955) was a New Zealand rugby league player who represented New Zealand.

Early life
Pearce was born, raised and educated in Christchurch.

Playing career
After playing rugby league for the Marist Club and Canterbury from 1926 to 1927, Pearce moved south to Dunedin and joined the Christian Brothers Rugby League Club. Considered at the time to be one of the fastest league wingers in the country, Pearce represented Otago in 1928 and 1929 before gaining national selection in 1930, when the New Zealand side toured Australia, playing in two matches against New South Wales. He also represented the South Island in 1930.

He later drowned in Foveaux Strait in 1955, and was buried at Bluff Cemetery.

References

1908 births
1955 deaths
Rugby league players from Christchurch
New Zealand rugby league players
New Zealand national rugby league team players
Otago rugby league team players
Rugby league centres
Deaths by drowning in New Zealand
Canterbury rugby league team players
South Island rugby league team players